William J. Kelly   was an American professional baseball player. He played in 18 games for the Fort Wayne Kekiongas in the first professional league, the 1871 National Association of Professional Base Ball Players (NAPBBP).

External links

Major League Baseball outfielders
Baseball players from New York (state)
Fort Wayne Kekiongas players
19th-century baseball players
Year of death missing
Year of birth missing